Hess Corporation (formerly Amerada Hess Corporation) is an American global independent energy company involved in the exploration and production of crude oil and natural gas. It was formed by the merger of Hess Oil and Chemical and Amerada Petroleum in 1968. Leon Hess served as CEO from the early 1960s through 1995, after which his son John B Hess succeeded him as chairman and CEO.

Headquartered in New York City,  the company ranked 394th in the 2016 annual ranking of Fortune 500 corporations. In 2020, Forbes Global 2000 ranked Hess as the 1,253rd largest public company in the world.

The company has exploration and production operations on-shore in the United States (North Dakota) and Libya, and off-shore in the United States (Gulf of Mexico), Canada, South America (Guyana and Suriname),  and Southeast Asia (Malaysia and the Joint Development Area of Malaysia and Thailand).

History
In 1919, British oil entrepreneur Lord Cowdray formed the Amerada Corporation to explore oil production in North America. The firm was incorporated on February 7, 1920, in Delaware as a holding company for its principal subsidiary, the Amerada Petroleum Corporation. The oil producer experienced growth during most of the 1920s, hitting a peak in 1926 with a net income of US$4.9 million. However, in the years leading to the Great Depression, weakness in the oil markets contributed to sluggish profits. The aftermath of the market crash aggravated an already unsteady oil industry. In the first quarter of 1930, the company experienced a minor loss. The early years of the Depression were a struggle against wavering demand and overproduction in some regions. Later into the 1930s, financial forecasts for Amerada became more positive.

In December 1941, the company reorganized by merging the holding company and the principal operating subsidiary, Amerada Petroleum Corporation, into a simplified operating company. The new entity also adopted the former subsidiary's name.

In 1955, robust post-war growth grew the company to over US$100 million in annual sales.

Hess Oil and Chemical, an oil refiner and marketer, founded by Leon Hess, acquired 10% of the company for US$100 million in 1966 from the British government. Albert Levinson became the senior vice president and designed the modern-day Hess logo. In December 1968, Hess and Amerada would announce plans for a merger. Some Amerada stockholders led by Morton Adler criticized the arrangement as being too favorable for Hess. Adler argued that Amerada's oil reserves would contribute the lion's share of assets for the proposed company, and that Amerada stockholders should retain greater control of the new company. Before the stockholder vote on the matter, Phillips Petroleum, an integrated oil firm, approached Amerada with its merger proposal, but the offer was declined in March 1969. Still interested, Phillips nonetheless stated it would not carry out a lawsuit against the proposed Hess deal. Hess, fearing such a strategy, made a cash tender offer of US$140 million for an additional 1.1 million shares of Amerada, which would double its holding in the company. The new claims would be employed in a May stockholder vote deciding the merger's fate. The voting took place amidst shareholder rancor that, in addition to echoing Adler's arguments, objected to Amerada's financing of the recently completed tender offer. Hess planned to cancel the shares, and the newly formed company would absorb the cost of the acquisition. One shareholder at the meeting quipped, "It looks to me as if Hess is buying Amerada with Amerada's money." Proponents of the deal won and the US$2.4 billion mergers combining a pure production company with a refinery and marketer operation was completed. However, the controversy was not yet extinguished by the stockholder confirmation. A federal class-action lawsuit was filed in 1972, which claimed that the proxy vote information was misleading. In 1976, a court agreed that the company falsely claimed to have considered each company's assets as a reason for the merger.

In February 2000, Hess acquired the Meadville Corporation and rebranded all 178 Merit gas stations as Hess. The Merit gas station chain was primarily located in the Boston, New York, and Philadelphia markets.

In 2001, Amerada Hess purchased Triton Energy Limited in a cash tender deal valued at approximately US$3.2 billion. Triton, one of the largest independent oil and natural gas exploration and production companies in the United States, had earned a reputation as a maverick oil company due to its highly successful yet potentially risky overseas exploration. According to contemporary Amerada Hess press releases, Triton's major oil and gas assets in West Africa, Latin America, and Southeast Asia would strengthen its exploration and production business and provide access to long life international reserves. Hess also stated that the purchase was expected to immediately increase the company's per-day barrel output by more than 25 percent.

Similarly in 2001, Amerada Hess entered into a joint venture with A.T. Williams Oil Co. of Winston-Salem, North Carolina. The company and the gas stations were changed and called WilcoHess. After the joint merger, there existed some 1200 WilcoHess stations.

Following on the heels of the Triton purchase, energy prices fell and global economies weakened. Amerada Hess struggled through the following years, and in 2002 posted a US$218 million loss due primarily to a US$530 million charge relating to its write-down of the Ceiba oil field. In March 2002, TXU Europe bought the UK retail gas and electricity business of Amerada Hess. However, from 2003 through 2006, Amerada Hess posted steadily increasing profits as the company reported US$1.920 billion in net income.

In May 2006, Amerada Hess Corp. changed its name to Hess Corp.

On January 18, 2012, the company announced that it would close the Hovensa refinery in St. Croix, United States Virgin Islands by mid-February 2012. The refinery would continue to serve as a storage terminal.

By the end of February 2013, Hess permanently closed its Port Reading, New Jersey petroleum refinery. Gas prices had risen to their highest levels since October 2012 and Hess said it would lay off 170 of 217 employees at the plant, exit the refinery business and look for a buyer for its 19 storage terminals. The company decided that going forward, it would focus on exploration and production. A Hess press release announced the company's plans for "Fully exiting the Company's downstream businesses, including retail, energy marketing, and energy trading." There was no link between the announcement of the closing of the Woodbridge (Port Reading) NJ facility and the rise in gas prices afterwards, as the output of that facility was more geared to the aviation and specialty fuels markets and not automotive grade products.

On March 4, 2013, Hess announced that it would sell its domestic refineries and retail operations. The New York Times reported that Hess retail and refinery operations contributed about 4 percent of the company's revenue. It also noted that Hess would sell its holdings in Indonesia and Thailand. The company would focus exclusively on oil production, following a trend in the oil industry for companies to spin off their downstream assets and focus on their more profitable upstream business; ConocoPhillips and Marathon Oil also made similar spinoffs in recent years with Phillips 66 and Marathon Petroleum, respectively.

In April 2013, Hess Corp announced it would be selling its Russian unit to Lukoil for $2.05 billion. In July 2013, Hess Corp said it would sell its energy marketing unit to UK firm Centrica for around $1.03 billion.

In October 2013, Hess Corp announced plans to sell its East Coast and St. Lucia storage terminal network to Buckeye Partners LP for $850 million.

In December 2013, Hess Corp announced that it was selling its Indonesian assets to an Indonesian petroleum consortium.

On January 8, 2014, Hess filed for a tax-free spin-off of its gas station network. The newly formed company was to be known as Hess Retail and would include over 1,200 stores throughout the Eastern United States. Before completing the spin-off, Marathon Petroleum subsidiary Speedway LLC announced on May 22, 2014, that it would acquire the retail unit of Hess Corp for $2.87 billion. Following the closure of the acquisition in late 2014, all Hess gas stations were rebranded as Speedway gas stations by the end of 2017. The transaction completed the transformation of Hess into an energy company focused solely on exploration and production, effectively reversing the Amerada merger of almost 50 years prior.

In 2014, Hess completed a multi-year transformation to be recognized as an exploration and production company by exiting all downstream operations, generating approximately $13 billion from assets sales beginning in 2013. Hess sold its gas station network to Marathon Petroleum (which operates under the retail brand Speedway) and sold its wholesale and retail oil, natural gas and electricity marketing business to Direct Energy. It also closed its refineries in Port Reading, NJ and St. Croix, USVI (Hovensa JV with PDVSA), sold most of its bulk storage and terminaling business to Buckeye Partners, and sold its 50% interests in two New Jersey power plants to their respective JV partners (Bayonne Energy Center: ArcLight Capital and Newark Energy Center: Ares EIF). Hess also sold its 50% interest in its JV commodities trading arm HETCO (Hess Energy Trading Company) to Oaktree Capital. HETCO is now known as Hartree Partners.

Environmental record
On October 28, 1990, The New York Times reported that a barge containing  of kerosene struck a reef in the Hudson River, spilling  of fuel. Immediately, Hess assumed responsibility for the cleanup; the Coast Guard worked alongside the Red Star company to clean and to contain the spill to one area. Coast Guard official Mr. Holmes said "The weather and wind conditions are almost as close to perfect as they could get," and this contributed to a quicker and surer cleanup than would otherwise be the case. According to The New York Times, Mr. Holmes also said that 70 percent of the spill would be gone in three days due to the natural evaporation rate of kerosene. Even though most kerosene evaporates, toxic chemicals such as benzene stay in the water and harm certain fish. Hess claimed that their corporate policy has "long stressed" their "fundamental commitment to comply with applicable environment, health and safety laws and regulations," and they claimed to clean every spill that occurred.

Following a New York State Department of Environmental Conservation (DEC) agreement, the Hess Corporation would pay $1.1 million in fines and also "bring 65 gasoline stations and oil storage facilities into compliance with state requirements." The agreement addressed more than 100 violations at 65 gas stations and Hess's Brooklyn major oil storage facility. The agreement was aimed at resolving Hess's violations in the DEC's New York City and lower Hudson Valley regions.

In a recent water contamination case against several major US oil companies, the Hess Corporation was forced to pay part of a $422 million settlement. The case was filed by 153 public water providers in 17 states against the oil companies "over drinking water contamination caused by the gasoline additive Methyl Tertiary Butyl Ether (MTBE)." The settlement also stipulated that the settling parties pay their share of treatment costs of the plaintiff's wells that may become contaminated or require treatment for the next 30 years.

Hess outlined in their 2006 Corporate Sustainability Report a "four-element" strategy to reduce and control greenhouse gas emissions. The strategy's steps included monitoring, measuring, managing, and mitigating the emissions. The company intended to improve its environmental impact through reporting results, increasing energy efficiency and recovery, and participating in carbon capture and trading.

In December 2022, Hess Corporation entered a deal with Guyana to buy $750 million worth of REDD+ carbon credits from the South American nation in the next decade to support efforts in protecting its Amazonian rainforests.

Locations
Before the March 4, 2013 announcement of its withdrawal from refining and retail sales of petroleum products, Hess operated gas stations in Alabama, Arkansas, Connecticut, Delaware, District of Columbia, Florida, Georgia, Maryland, Massachusetts, New Hampshire, New Jersey, New York, North Carolina, Pennsylvania, Rhode Island, South Carolina, Tennessee, and Virginia.

In May 2014, Speedway LLC, a subsidiary of Marathon Petroleum Company, announced they would purchase Hess Corporation's retail business for $2.6 billion. Hess had 1,342 locations across the Eastern United States. The conversion from Hess branding to Speedway branding took place over the course of 2015. This also included all the WilcoHess locations, which Hess had acquired outright shortly before exiting the retail business. Subsequently, in 2016 Speedway and Pilot Flying J entered into a joint venture called PFJ Southeast LLC, which manages all of the former WilcoHess truck stops; the locations are managed by Pilot and were rebranded as either Pilot or Flying J.

In 2021, 7-Eleven acquired Speedway from Marathon, bringing the former Hess locations in the fold. Due to antitrust reasons, the Federal Trade Commission forced 7-Eleven and Marathon to divest 291 Speedway locations to third party buyers; the majority of those locations were former Hess locations in Florida and New York, as well as several in California that Marathon had acquired in its 2018 acquisition of Andeavor.

As of 2018, Hess locations remain in select states including Connecticut.

See also 
 Alaska v. Amerada Hess
 Hess Corporation (toys)

References

External links 

Hess family
Woodbridge Township, New Jersey
Companies based in Middlesex County, New Jersey
Companies based in New York City
Economy of the Eastern United States
Oil companies of the United States
Companies listed on the New York Stock Exchange
Retail companies established in 1919
Retail companies disestablished in 2015
Non-renewable resource companies established in 1919
Gas stations in the United States